Ruardean Woodside is a village in Gloucestershire, England, located in the Forest of Dean and tucked away behind Ruardean Hill and Brierley.  There is a primary school and a village hall. The Roebuck was the last of the local pubs to close.

Education

Woodside Primary School (informally known as The Slad) is located at the bottom of the village, on the road between neighbouring settlements of Brierley and Ruardean. The nearest secondary school is Dene Magna Community School in Mitcheldean.

Nearby places
Ruardean Hill
Brierley
The Pludds
Ruardean

See also
Ruardean

References

External links 

photos of Ruardean Woodside and surrounding area on geograph
Woodside Primary School's Website

Villages in Gloucestershire
Forest of Dean